Fernand Boden (born 13 September 1943) is a politician from Luxembourg. He was a minister in the government of Luxembourg from 1979 to 2009.

Boden was born in Echternach. He studied Mathematics and Physics at the University of Liège, and between 1966 and 1978 he taught at Echternach grammar school. He served as deputy mayor of Echternach from 1970 to 1976 and was a member of the local council.

He was first elected to the Chamber of Deputies of Luxembourg from the Eastern Constituency as a member of the Christian Social People's Party in 1978; he was re-elected in 1979. He joined the government in 1979 as Minister of National Education and Youth and Minister of Tourism, holding those portfolios until 1989. In the latter year he was moved to the posts of Minister for Family and Solidarity and Minister of the Middle Classes and Tourism, and in 1994 he became Minister for the Civil Service. He served in the latter position until 26 January 1995, when he became Minister of Agriculture, Viticulture and Rural Development and Minister for the Middle Classes, Tourism, and Housing. He retained those portfolios for over 14 years, until being replaced in July 2009.

References

Government ministers of Luxembourg
Members of the Chamber of Deputies (Luxembourg)
Members of the Chamber of Deputies (Luxembourg) from Est
Christian Social People's Party politicians
Luxembourgian educators
University of Liège alumni
1943 births
Living people
People from Echternach
Ministers for Agriculture of Luxembourg